Dukes County was a county of the Province of New York from 1683 to 1691. It was established on November 1, 1683, at the same time as Kings County, Queens County, and Dutchess County. It consisted of the Elizabeth Islands, Martha's Vineyard, and Nantucket Island, all east of Long Island. In 1691, the county was transferred to the newly formed Province of Massachusetts Bay, where it was divided into Dukes County and Nantucket in Massachusetts.

Notes
 The Magazine of History with Notes and Queries, Contributor and Publisher William Abbatt, v.22 1916 Jan-Jun, page 76
 Simon Athearn’s 1694 rough Island map, now in the Massachusetts State Archives, was published in Arthur Railton’s The History of Martha’s Vineyard. 

1683 establishments in the Province of New York
1691 establishments in the Province of New York
Former counties of the United States
History of Dukes County, Massachusetts
History of Nantucket, Massachusetts
Pre-statehood history of Massachusetts
Pre-statehood history of New York (state)